†Partula arguta is a species of air-breathing tropical land snail, a terrestrial pulmonate gastropod mollusk in the family Partulidae. This species is endemic to French Polynesia. It is critically endangered.

References

External links

Partula (gastropod)
Extinct gastropods
Taxa named by William Harper Pease
Taxonomy articles created by Polbot
Gastropods described in 1864